Tribute to Range Riders is a bronze sculpture by Constance Whitney Warren, installed outside the Oklahoma State Capitol in Oklahoma City, in the U.S. state of Oklahoma. The statue depicts a cowboy riding a bucking horse.

References

Bronze sculptures in Oklahoma
Equestrian statues in Oklahoma
Outdoor sculptures in Oklahoma City
Sculptures of men in Oklahoma
Statues in Oklahoma